Tagger may refer to:

 Theodor Tagger (1891–1958), an Austrian-German writer and theater manager
 Part-of-speech tagging, in corpus linguistics the process of marking words in a corpus for part of speech
Brill tagger, a part-of-speech tagger designed by Eric Brill in 1995
 Tag editor, software that supports editing metadata of multimedia file formats
 A position in Australian rules football
 A type of graffiti artist

See also
 Tag (disambiguation)